Sternophysinx is a genus of crustaceans belonging to the monotypic family Sternophysingidae.

The species of this genus are found in Southern Africa.

Species:

Sternophysinx alca 
Sternophysinx basilobata 
Sternophysinx calceola 
Sternophysinx filaris 
Sternophysinx hibernica 
Sternophysinx megacheles 
Sternophysinx robertsi 
Sternophysinx transvaalensis

References

Amphipoda